Amt Döbern-Land is an Amt ("collective municipality") in the district of Spree-Neiße, in Brandenburg, Germany. Its seat is in Döbern.

The Amt Döbern-Land consists of the following municipalities:
Döbern
Felixsee
Groß Schacksdorf-Simmersdorf
Jämlitz-Klein Düben
Neiße-Malxetal
Tschernitz
Wiesengrund

Demography

References

Dobern
Spree-Neiße